Visitor is a  mountain in the Dinaric Alps in Montenegro. It is situated west of Plav and Lake Plav, from which the river Lim flows. While Visitor foothills are covered with forest, its upper part is made up of alpine meadows and rocks.

References

External links

Mountains of Montenegro
Plav, Montenegro